Sawando Dam  is a dam in the Nagano Prefecture, Japan.

Dams in Nagano Prefecture